Elíal is a Castilian Spanish experimental pop band from Valencia, Spain. The band was founded by Alberto Amar (vocals, guitar, and piano) and Eli m Rufat (vocals and synths) in July 2012. Their influences include artists like James Blake, Portishead, Piratas, or Radiohead.

History 
The name "Elíal" originated from Amar and Rufat's prior work together as visual artists, in which they would sign their work as such. In their first year together, Elíal released their self-titled debut EP produced by Pablo Silva. Initially the band consisted of only Amar and Rufat, but by November 2012, they were joined by Dani Odisseu (guitar). That month the EP was officially launched with a concert at the Sala Wa Wa in Valencia. The show was positively reviewed, being described as a "cosmic spectacle" as well as "conquering and convincing". They have since performed regularly in Valencia and Madrid. 
Their first full album, Dentro, was released in the fall of 2014. It was recorded in the mountains of Cuenca, and produced by Suso Saiz.

Members
 Alberto Amar (guitar, piano)
 Eli m Rufat (vocals, keyboard)
 Dani Odisseu (guitar)

Discography
 Elíal - EP (2012)
 Luz (single, 2014)
 Dentro (2014)

References

Spanish pop music groups